Gandhinagar (also Gandhi Nagar) is locality in Vellore, located on the northern bank of the Palar River.It is divided into Gandhi Nagar East and Gandhi Nagar West, it is the one of the posh residential and commercial localities in Vellore city.

Geography

Demographics
, Gandhinagar's population is 9708. Males constitute 48% of the population and females constitute 52%. Gandhinagar has an average literacy rate of 90%, higher than the national average of 59.5%. Male literacy is 91%, and female literacy is 90%.

Notable residents
G. Viswanathan, founder and chancellor of Vellore Institute of Technology.
Durai Murugan, former Law minister.

References

Vellore
Neighbourhoods in Vellore